

The HPA Toucan is a British two-seat human-powered aircraft built and flown by members of the Hertfordshire Pedal Aeronauts and was the first two-person human-powered aircraft to fly.

Development
The Hertfordshire Pedal Aeronauts was formed in 1965, mainly from the staff of Handley Page Limited, to design and build a human-powered aircraft and to compete for the Kremer Prize. The aircraft, unique in being powered by two persons, was designed by Martyn Pressnell. Pressnell was at the time a stress engineer with Handley Page. Partly funded by a grant from the Royal Aeronautical Society construction began in 1967 and was completed in 1972. Following taxying trials at Radlett Aerodrome on 16 June 1972 when brief hops were made, the aircraft made its first flight on 23 December 1972.

Design
The Toucan is a mid-wing cantilever monoplane with the fuselage a braced structure of spruce and  balsa and covered with Melinex. The wing spars had spruce booms and plywood edges and the ribs were made from balsa and like the fuselage it was covered with Melenix. The landing gear was a non-retractable the main wheel and tailwheel in tandem, it also had small outrigger wheels under the wings. The two crew sit in tandem under a transparent removable cover, the power is generated by the two crew using bicycle pedals which were connected by chains to drive the main wheel and via a shaft a two-bladed balsa pusher propeller mounted at the rear of the tail unit.

Specifications

See also

References

Notes

Bibliography

1970s British experimental aircraft
Human-powered aircraft
Pusher aircraft
Twin-engined single-prop pusher aircraft
Aircraft first flown in 1972
Mid-wing aircraft